Lauri Ilmari Mononen (22 March 1950 – 5 August 2018) was a Finnish professional ice hockey winger. While playing for Phoenix Roadrunners in the World Hockey Association he was one of the first Finns to play professional hockey in North America. He played for a total of two seasons in WHA. He also won the Finnish Championship once and the Swiss Championship once. He was twice chosen as best forward in the Finnish League and selected to All Star five three times (1969, 1972, 1975). He also competed in the men's tournament at the 1972 Winter Olympics.

His number 15 has been frozen by his former club, Jokipojat. He was inducted into the Finnish Hockey Hall of Fame as number 75.

References

External links

1950 births
2018 deaths
Finnish ice hockey right wingers
HIFK players
Jokerit players
Jokipojat players
Oklahoma City Blazers (1965–1977) players
Peliitat Heinola players
People from Joensuu
Phoenix Roadrunners (WHA) players
SC Bern players
HC TPS players
Olympic ice hockey players of Finland
Ice hockey players at the 1972 Winter Olympics
Sportspeople from North Karelia